The Ind Coope Ground was a cricket ground in Burton, England where Derbyshire CCC played between 1938 and 1980. In most years, the ground would host at least one County Championship match. Staffordshire CCC used the ground between 1987 and 1991 for NatWest Trophy and Minor Counties Championship matches.

The ground hosted 38 first-class matches and 7 List A matches.

The ground is named after the former brewing firm Ind Coope.

Game Information:
{| class="wikitable"
|-
! Game Type
! No. of Games
|-
| County Championship Matches
| 35
|-
| limited-over county matches
| 7
|-
| Twenty20 matches
| 0
|}

Game Statistics: first-class:
{| class="wikitable"
|-
! Category
! Information
|-
| Highest Team Score
| There have been no team scores of more than 500 on this ground
|-
| Lowest Team Score
| Hampshire (23 against Derbyshire) in 1958
|-
| Best Batting Performance
| John Langridge (184 Runs for Sussex against Derbyshire in 1950
|-
| Best Bowling Performance
| George Pope (8/38 for Derbyshire against Sussex) in 1948
|}

Game Statistics: one-day:
{| class="wikitable"
|-
! Category
! Information
|-
| Highest Team Score
| Surrey (285/9 in 60 overs against Staffordshire) in 1988
|-
| Lowest Team Score
| Derbyshire (23 against Leicestershire) in 1975
|-
| Best Batting Performance
| Geoff Humpage (76 Runs for Warwickshire against Staffordshire in 1987
|-
| Best Bowling Performance
| Allan Donald (5/24 for Warwickshire against Staffordshire) in 1987
|}

External links
 Cricinfo Website - Ground Page
 Cricket Archive page

Cricket grounds in Staffordshire
Defunct cricket grounds in England